Gezina  Hermina Johanna van der Molen (Baflo, 20 January 1892 - Aerdenhout, 9 October 1978) was a Dutch legal scholar and resistance fighter during the Second World War. From 1924 to 1929, she studied law at the Free University of Amsterdam — the first female student to do so — and was also the first woman to obtain a doctoral degree from there. She dealt with numerous issues: the rights of women, apartheid in South Africa, the United Nations, the South Moluccas and New Guinea.

Work
 Alberto Gentili and the Development of International Law. His Life Work and Times. Leyden, A.W.Sijthoff, 1968, 2nd, revised edition.

References

1892 births
1978 deaths
20th-century Dutch lawyers
Dutch legal scholars
Dutch resistance members
International law scholars
People from Winsum
Vrije Universiteit Amsterdam alumni
Academic staff of Vrije Universiteit Amsterdam
Women legal scholars